Ditbardh Cuko and Josef Cuko were a sibling pair of Albanian mass murderers who killed five people in Albania during a robbery in the town of Libofshë in June 1992. The two stole 5,000 leks, the equivalent of $50. The victims were all members of the same family and were bludgeoned to death with metal bars. The youngest victim was a seven-month-old baby. The Cuko brothers were convicted of murder, sentenced to death, and hanged on 25 June 1992. After their executions, their bodies were left hanging in public for a day in the city of Fier. The public was overwhelmingly in favor of the executions, with some spectators saying the Cuko brothers should have been tortured beforehand.

References 

Albanian mass murderers
Executed mass murderers
People executed by Albania by hanging
20th-century executions by Albania
1992 deaths
20th-century criminals
Massacres in Albania
Massacres in 1992